Glorioso Día is the first album in Spanish by American contemporary worship band Passion. Glorioso Dia is a collection of 10 worship songs that feature some of the most important worship hymns throughout the band's years. SixSteps Records released the album September 1, 2017.

Critical reception

Joshua Andre specifying in a four and a half star review for 365 Days of Inspiring Media, replies, "Glorioso Dia is an album that deserves to be bought on iTunes by many people, regardless if you know Spanish or not; I guarantee those who love worship music will love this record! God deserves all the praise for this spectacular album, and then some more!"

Track list

NOTE:  These songs are Spanish-language translations of Passion songs in English.  The original English-language song is listed next to each title.

Personnel
Adapted from AllMusic.

 Passion – primary artist
 Pat Barrett – composer, featured artist
 Sean Curran – composer, featured artist
 Melodie Malone – composer, featured artist
 Kristian Stanfill – composer, featured artist
 Brett Younker – composer, featured artist
 Jeff Johnson – featured artist
 Brenton Brown – composer
 Tony Brown – composer
 Daniel Carson – composer
 Jess Cates – composer
 Mia Fieldes – composer
 Jason Ingram – composer
 Kirby Kaple – composer
 Karl Martin – composer
 Jonas Myrin – composer
 Matt Redman – composer
 Jonathan Smith – composer
 Chris Tomlin – composer
 Phil Wickham – composer
 Maurice Williams – composer

Chart performance

References

2017 albums
Passion (worship band) albums